Breakbeat Era was a British music group from Bristol. It consisted of producers Roni Size and DJ Die and singer Leonie Laws. The group released a studio album, Ultra-Obscene, in 1999. It peaked at number 31 on the UK Albums Chart.

Discography

Studio albums
 Ultra-Obscene (1999)

Singles
 "Breakbeat Era" (1998)
 "Ultra-Obscene" (1999)
 "Bullitproof" (2000)

References

External links
 

English electronic music groups
British drum and bass music groups
British musical trios
Musical groups from Bristol
XL Recordings artists